Regine Berg (born 5 October 1958) is a Belgian former track and field sprinter who specialised in the 400 metres. Born in Ostend, she represented her country at the Summer Olympics in 1976 and 1980. Berg won five national titles over 400 m and also two over 800 metres later in her career. She was a silver medallist at the 1985 IAAF World Indoor Games and participated three times at the European Athletics Indoor Championships.

Berg's 400 m indoor best of 53.13 seconds was the Belgian record for nearly 35 years until it was bested by Cynthia Bolingo's 52.70 at the 2019 Belgian Indoor Athletics Championships. She also shared in the 4 × 400 metres relay national record, set with Lea Alaerts, Anne Michel and Rosine Wallez at the 1980 Moscow Olympics that stood for 38 years until it was bested by the Belgian Cheetahs. Her outdoor bests are 52.29 seconds for the 400 m and 2:00.43 minutes for the 800 m.

International competitions

National titles
Belgian Athletics Championships
400 metres: 1976, 1983, 1984, 1985, 1986
800 metres: 1987, 1988

References

External links

Living people
1958 births
Sportspeople from Ostend
Belgian female sprinters
Olympic athletes of Belgium
Athletes (track and field) at the 1976 Summer Olympics
Athletes (track and field) at the 1980 Summer Olympics
World Athletics Indoor Championships medalists
Olympic female sprinters